Louis Wood Mahaffey ( – ) was a Major League Baseball pitcher who played one season with the Louisville Colonels. He played eight professional teams but only played one game at the major league level.

Professional career

Early career
He played in the Western Interstate League, the Western Association and the Western League before he got a chance to play with Louisville in the Major Leagues.

Louisville Colonels
Mahaffey made five plate appearances, walking once and failed to get on base the other four times.

Portland Webfoots
A few weeks into the season he was forced to change his position from pitcher to first base by manager Jack Grim. He hit .197 with 62 hits in 315 at bats. On the fielding side he committed 32 errors in 80 games. In , Mahaffey returned to Portland where he hit .230 with 26 hits in 113 at bats. After Lou Mahaffey's brother and teammate Joe injured his arm after pitching a 16 inning game for the Webfoots, manager Sammy Vigneux announced he was releasing Joe. Lou Mahaffey quit the team in response.

Umpire career
After retiring from playing, Mahaffey was hired to umpire in the Northwestern League in 1905. He joined the Pacific Coast League as an umpire in 1906. In 1907 Mahaffey got into a dispute with league president J. Cal Ewing over wages which led to Mahaffey's resignation. Mahaffey claimed other league umpires received $50 to $100 more and was quoted by the Morning Oregonian as saying, "I have never yet worked for less than the other fellows and it's too late to begin now."

Personal life
The Morning Oregonian reported in 1911 that Mahaffey was managing a cafe in Los Angeles, California. In November 1913 Mahaffey's wife went to the San Francisco Police Department to report her husband had abandoned her without material support. According to Mrs. Mahaffey she planned to meet her husband on a train to Los Angeles, but it departed before she arrived to the station. She telegraphed ahead, but received no reply.

References

External links

Career statistics and player information from Baseball Almanac.

1874 births
1949 deaths
Sportspeople from Madison, Wisconsin
Baseball players from Wisconsin
Louisville Colonels players
Terre Haute Hottentots players
Indianapolis Hoosiers (minor league) players
Burlington Colts players
Cedar Rapids Rabbits players
Portland Webfoots players
Portland Webfotts players
19th-century baseball players